Pfäffikon is the principal town of the Municipality of Freienbach in the canton of Schwyz (SZ) in Switzerland. Together with Wollerau, Pfäffikon is considered the principal town of the district (Bezirk) of Höfe and the center of the region of Ausserschwyz. The former farm town is known today as cultural, economic and service center with its main focus on hedge funds. With 7,200 residents Pfäffikon is the third biggest town of the canton after Küssnacht and Einsiedeln.

Politics 
Pfäffikon, together with Wilen bei Wollerau, Freienbach, Bäch and Hurden form the Municipality of Freienbach, but being the main traffic junction in the area it is the most important town in the municipality. In 1848 Pfäffikon lost its independent status and was subsequently merged into Freienbach. With important administrative and educational centers as well as one of the two fire departments of the canton in town, Pfäffikon became the second, northern center of the canton, especially since the canton's capital, Schwyz, across in the foothills of the Alps is relatively difficult to reach (via Biberbrugg-Rothenthurm). This resulted in Pfäffikon orienting itself more towards Zürich than Schwyz, causing political tensions. The closeness to Zürich as well as the low tax rates led to Pfäffikon's position as economic center of the canton.

Business location 
With the lowest tax burden for companies and private individuals and ideally located between the dynamic Zurich economic area and attractive recreation areas, Pfäffikon represents

Taxation 
Pfäffikon has very sensible government spending and has managed to always maintain a positive balance sheet. The large increase of tax payers and the amount of taxes paid by mainly the financial industry made it possible to lower taxes to the residents and businesses of Pfäffikon for 5 years in a row, resulting in the lowest tax rates of Switzerland.

Economy 

In the last 10 years Pfäffikon became an important financial center housing many asset management companies, (fund of) hedge funds, (fund of) private equity funds, family offices, etc. Together with Zug in canton Zug, Pfäffikon in canton Schwyz has become one of the most important financial centers in Switzerland.  The total assets managed out of Switzerland exceed EUR 100 billion. The economic boom started in Pfäffikon in the 1990s when Swiss banking regulations eased up. The closeness to Zurich as well as the low tax rates were also responsible for the rapid development, leading to some major financial institutions to relocate to Pfäffikon. The biggest and best known companies in Pfäffikon are OC Oerlikon, Man Group, Pamasol and LGT Group, Glacier Reinsurance, Markant AG, Charles Vögele and Seedamm-Center.

Education 
Pfäffikon offers 8 kindergartens, 3 primary schools and one secondary school as well one of the two cantonwide schools and an open university.

Private schools:
 SIS Swiss International School Pfäffikon-Schwyz

Transportation
The municipality is located on the A3 motorway.

Pfäffikon SZ railway station is a terminal of the Zürich S-Bahn on the line S5, a stop on the line S40 heading to Rapperswil, and on the lines S2, S8 and S25 via Horgen on the left side of the Lake Zürich. Journey times from Zürich Hauptbahnhof vary from 25 minutes to over 40 minutes depending on the route and service.

People 
 Beatrice Egli (born 1988), singer

References

External links 

Municipality of Freienbach/Pfäffikon
Pfäffikon as it was years ago.

Villages in the canton of Schwyz
Freienbach
Populated places on Lake Zurich